Jon Marshall (born September 8, 1975), better known by his stage name Fat Jon the Ample Soul Physician, is an American hip hop producer and rapper from Cincinnati, Ohio. He is a member of the American hip-hop group Five Deez. He is also one half of 3582 with J. Rawls, one half of Rebel Clique with vocalist Amleset Solomon, and one half of Beautiful Killing Machine with Sonic Brown of Five Deez. Fat Jon is also credited as part of the production team that scored the music for the anime series Samurai Champloo. He currently resides in Frankfurt, Germany.

Discography

Solo albums
 Humanoid Erotica (2001) as Maurice Galactica
 Wave Motion (2002)
 Lightweight Heavy (2004)
 Afterthought (2006)
 Hundred Eight Stars (2007)
 Repaint Tomorrow (2008)
 Rapture Kontrolle (2012) as Maurice Galactica
 God's Fifth Wish (2020)
 Plaything: Cipher (2022) as Maurice Galactica

Group albums
 Koolmotor (2001) (with Five Deez)
 The Living Soul (2001)  (with J. Rawls, as 3582)
 Kinkynasti (2003) (with Five Deez)
 Situational Ethics (2003) (with J. Rawls, as 3582)
 Slow Children Playing (2005) (with Five Deez)
 Unique Connection (2005) (with Amleset Solomon, as Rebel Clique)
 Kommunicator (2006) (with Five Deez)
 Still Curious (2007) (with Amleset Solomon, as Rebel Clique)
 Beautiful Killing Machine (2010) (with Sonic Brown of Five Deez, as Beautiful Killing Machine)

Collaboration albums
 The Same Channel (2006) (with Styrofoam)

Soundtrack albums
 Samurai Champloo Music Record: Departure (2004) (with Nujabes)
 Samurai Champloo Music Record: Impression (2004) (with FORCE OF NATURE and Nujabes)
 Tephlon Funk: The Free Tape (2016)
 Tephlon Funk: The Dope Tape (2020)

EPs
 Stasis (2000)
 Dyslexic (2000)

Singles
 Everywhere (2004)
 Torn Again (2004)

Productions
 "Neapolitan" by Doseone on Hemispheres (1998)
 "Outreach 5" by Mr. Dibbs on The 30th Song (2003)

References

External links
 Official website
 BBC - Dance Review - Fat Jon the Ample Soul Physician, Lightweight Heavy

1975 births
Living people
Midwest hip hop musicians
Hip hop record producers
Rappers from Cincinnati
American expatriates in Germany
21st-century American rappers